Copper(III) oxide is a hypothetical inorganic compound with the formula Cu2O3. It has not been isolated as a pure solid. Copper(III) oxides are constituents of cuprate superconductors. Copper(III) is typically stabilized in an ionic environment, e.g. potassium hexafluorocuprate(III).

References

Chemical encyclopedia / Editorial Board .: Knuniants IL etc. .. - M.: Soviet Encyclopedia, 1990 - V. 2 - 671 s. - .
R. Ripa, Chetyanu I. Inorganic Chemistry. Chemistry of Metals. - M.: Mir, 1972 - V. 2 - 871 s.

Copper compounds
Hypothetical chemical compounds
Transition metal oxides
Sesquioxides